Anders Rozenkrantz Lindegaard (born 13 April 1984) is a Danish former professional footballer who played as a goalkeeper. He has earned five caps for the Denmark national team.

Lindegaard began his career with his hometown club, Odense Boldklub, but a lack of first-team opportunities led to a move to Norwegian club Aalesund in 2009, with whom he won the Norwegian Football Cup. After winning the Goalkeeper of the Year award in both Denmark and Norway in 2010, Lindegaard was signed by Manchester United, where he played for five years as a back-up to Edwin van der Sar and David de Gea. He moved to West Bromwich Albion in 2015, but was unable to break into the team and joined Preston North End in January 2016, initially on loan. He joined Burnley in September 2017.

Lindegaard represented Denmark at under-19 and under-20 level before making his senior debut on 7 September 2010 against Iceland.

Club career

Odense
Born in the Dyrup suburb of Odense, Lindegaard started his career at local Danish Superliga team Odense Boldklub (OB). He made his Danish Superliga debut in a 3–1 victory against Silkeborg IF on 19 November 2006. He made his UEFA competition debut on 30 July 2009, in a 4–3 win over Rabotnički. During most of his time with OB, he was kept out of the team by Arek Onyszko, and he had two loan spells at Kolding FC, where he remained undefeated in the ten league games he got for the team, after it had lost the first four games of the season, and Aalesunds FK, who he would later join permanently. When Onyszko was sacked by Odense in June 2009 due to him being convicted for assaulting his ex-wife, Lindegaard was seen as his replacement.

Aalesund
In 2009, he joined Norwegian club Aalesunds FK on loan and later permanently. In 2009, he won the Norwegian Football Cup with Aalesund. In 2010, Lindegaard was named Goalkeeper of the Year in both Norway and Denmark.

Manchester United

2010–11 season

Since early November 2010, he was reported to have become a target for English club Manchester United. On 23 November 2010, it was reported that Manchester United manager Sir Alex Ferguson expected to complete the signing of the player in the "next two or three weeks". On 27 November 2010, Lindegaard joined Manchester United on a three-and-a-half-year contract for an undisclosed fee believed to be around £3.5 million. He trained with the first team throughout December, but he was unable to play for his new club until the transfer window re-opened on 1 January 2011. Lindegaard was officially registered with the Premier League on 6 January, and assigned the number 34 jersey.

On 29 January, Lindegaard made his Manchester United debut in a 2–1 victory against Southampton in the FA Cup Fourth Round. He made his Old Trafford home debut on 19 February in another FA Cup match, this time against the Conference National side Crawley Town, in which United won 1–0. In March, he underwent knee surgery that would keep him out of action for five weeks.

On 16 May, Lindegaard played in the Manchester Senior Cup final for the Manchester United Reserves against Bolton Wanderers Reserves, which United went on to win 3–1.

2011–12 season
On 14 September, Lindegaard made his first UEFA Champions League start for United against Portuguese side Benfica. The match ended in a 1–1 draw with Lindegaard winning critical acclaim for his performance. Sir Alex Ferguson, however, still decided to continue with first-choice keeper David de Gea for the next match in the Premier League against Chelsea. Asked about challenging for the first-team spot, Lindegaard said, "What answer do you expect to that question? I've said a thousand times before I'm not here to pick my nose." On 18 October, Lindegaard was handed his second Champions League start for United. He played against Oțelul Galați, with the match ending in a 2–0 win for United, earning them their first Champions League group stage victory.

On 1 October 2011, Lindegaard made his Premier League debut for United against Norwich City in a 2–0 win at Old Trafford. He continued his run of clean sheets in his next four appearances in the Premier League, which included a 1–0 home win against Sunderland on 5 November, a 1–0 away win against Aston Villa on 3 December, a 5–0 away win at Fulham on 21 December and a 5–0 home win against Wigan Athletic in United's Boxing day fixture. His run of clean sheets in the league finally ended on 4 January away to Newcastle United when he was beaten three times in a game that United lost 3–0. A week later, on 8 January, Lindegaard played his biggest game for Manchester United so far, a 3–2 win against Manchester City in the FA Cup. He was chosen again for the starting line-up the following week when United beat Bolton Wanderers 3–0. On 30 January 2012, he damaged ankle ligaments in training, forcing him to miss the game against Stoke City the next day, along with the unwell first-choice David de Gea, meaning youngster Ben Amos played goal. Later in the week, Sir Alex Ferguson revealed Lindegaard would miss the next four to five weeks and would not be expected back until the home game with West Bromwich Albion.

On 3 August 2012, Lindegaard signed a new four-year contract with United, keeping him at the club until June 2016. He also took the number 13 jersey made vacant by the departure of Park Ji-sung, who had left the club for Queens Park Rangers.

2012–13 season
Since the match against Norwich on 17 November 2012, first-choice goalkeeper David de Gea was sidelined with wisdom teeth problems. Lindegaard was kept in goal for United's next five games until De Gea was recalled for the Champions League match against CFR Cluj. Lindegaard returned to the first team on 1 December 2012, against Reading in a match which ended 4–3. After the match, he came in for criticism by former United goalkeeper Alex Stepney, who said that he lacks "authority at the back". After a long period on the bench as an understudy to De Gea, and with United having already secured the Premier League title a month earlier, Lindegaard started in goal for Sir Alex Ferguson's final game as United manager against West Brom at The Hawthorns; the match finished 5–5. That appearance was Lindegaard's tenth of the season, thus qualifying him to receive a Premier League winner's medal.

2013–14 season
In 2013–14, Lindegaard made just three appearances for the Manchester United first team – against Norwich in the League Cup, Swansea City in the FA Cup and Newcastle in the Premier League– keeping clean sheets against Norwich and Newcastle.

West Bromwich Albion
On 31 August 2015, Lindegaard joined West Bromwich Albion on a free transfer, signing a two-year contract.

Preston North End
On 23 January 2016, Lindegaard joined Championship side Preston North End on loan for the remainder of the 2015–16 season. He made his debut on 2 February where he kept a clean sheet against Derby County. He was voted Man of the Match on his home debut, against Huddersfield Town.

On 2 July 2016, Lindegaard signed a one-year permanent deal with Preston North End after the mutual termination of his West Brom contract.

Burnley
On 21 September 2017, Lindegaard joined Premier League side Burnley on a free transfer. He made his Burnley debut as a substitute for the injured Nick Pope during the Europa League second qualifying round on 26 July 2018. After making another Europa League appearance against Aberdeen, his contract was not renewed and he was released by the club.

Helsingborg 
On 18 July 2019 Lindegaard signed for Allsvenskan side Helsingborgs IF until December 2021. On 19 July 2020, he scored the first goal of his career in a 2020 Allsvenskan 2–2 draw against Falkenbergs FF. 

After Helsingborg was relegated from Allsvenskan in November 2022, Lindegaard announced his retirement from football.

International career
Lindegaard has represented Denmark at under-19, under-20 and senior level. He made his debut for the U-19s in September 2002, and played a 2003 UEFA European Under-19 Football Championship qualification 1–0 win over Switzerland on 13 October 2002. He played a total six youth international games until September 2003.

Lindegaard made his senior international debut in a UEFA Euro 2012 qualifier against Iceland on 7 September 2010, which Denmark won 1–0. On 8 October 2010, Denmark faced Portugal in another Euro 2012 qualifier. Early on in the game, with Denmark trailing 2–0, an injury sustained by starting goalkeeper Thomas Sørensen brought Lindegaard into action. He made many saves to keep his team in the game, but conceded a goal in the 85th minute to Cristiano Ronaldo with the match finishing 3–1 in Portugal's favour. Lindegaard started the following Euro 2012 qualifier against Cyprus, in which he kept a clean sheet as Denmark won 2–0. He was expected to feature for Denmark at the Euro 2012 finals but due to injuries while playing for his club and lack of proper game time post-recovery, his national teammate Stephan Andersen took over after normal second-choice goalkeeper Thomas Sørensen was injured in a pre-tournament friendly against Brazil.

Personal life
Lindegaard married The Real Housewives of Cheshire star, Misse Beqiri, a Swedish model of Albanian roots, in June 2014. They split in 2016. They have a son named Julian.

LGBT activism
Lindegaard has spoken out against the intolerance of homosexuality in football and the absence of openly gay players from the game. In 2012, he wrote,

Career statistics

Club

International

Honours
Aalesund
Norwegian Football Cup: 2009

Manchester United
Premier League: 2012–13
FA Community Shield: 2011, 2013

Individual
Kniksen Goalkeeper of the Year: 2010
Danish Goalkeeper of the Year: 2010

References

External links

1984 births
Living people
Footballers from Odense
Danish men's footballers
Association football goalkeepers
Denmark international footballers
Denmark youth international footballers
UEFA Euro 2012 players
Danish Superliga players
Danish 1st Division players
Eliteserien players
Premier League players
English Football League players
Allsvenskan players
Odense Boldklub players
Kolding FC players
Aalesunds FK players
Manchester United F.C. players
West Bromwich Albion F.C. players
Preston North End F.C. players
Burnley F.C. players
Helsingborgs IF players
Danish twins
Twin sportspeople
Danish expatriate men's footballers
Danish expatriate sportspeople in Norway
Expatriate footballers in Norway
Danish expatriate sportspeople in England
Expatriate footballers in England
Danish expatriate sportspeople in Sweden
Expatriate footballers in Sweden